The 1991 NAIA Division II football season, as part of the 1991 college football season in the United States and the 36th season of college football sponsored by the NAIA, was the 22nd season of play of the NAIA's division II for football.

The season was played from August to November 1991 and culminated in the 1991 NAIA Division II Football National Championship, played in Georgetown, Kentucky on the campus of Georgetown College.

Georgetown (KY) defeated Pacific Lutheran in the championship game, 28–20, to win their first NAIA national title.

Conference standings

Conference champions

Postseason

‡ ''Game played at Puyallup, Washington

See also
 1991 NCAA Division I-A football season
 1991 NCAA Division I-AA football season
 1991 NCAA Division II football season
 1991 NCAA Division III football season

References

 
NAIA Football National Championship